Lucien Bonaparte Caswell (November 27, 1827April 26, 1919) was an American lawyer and Republican politician.  He served 14 years in the United States House of Representatives between 1875 and 1891, representing parts of southeast Wisconsin.

Biography
Lucien Bonaparte Caswell was born in Swanton, Vermont, on November 27, 1827. When he was nine, he moved with his family to the frontier Wisconsin Territory and settled along the Rock River, just south of Lake Koshkonong. Caswell attended Milton Academy and took a course at Beloit College in Beloit. He began to study law in Beloit with the practice of future United States Senator Matthew H. Carpenter. Caswell was admitted to the bar in October 1851. He moved to Fort Atkinson later that year, where he opened a law practice.

In 1854, Caswell was appointed the district attorney of Jefferson County. Caswell was elected to the Wisconsin State Assembly in 1863, 1872, and 1874. He founded the First National Bank of Fort Atkinson in 1863 and served as cashier for twenty-five years. He was with Governor Louis P. Harvey on his fatal trip to visit Wisconsin troops in Tennessee. Caswell was selected as a delegate to the 1868 Republican National Convention and supported Ulysses S. Grant.

Caswell served seven terms in the United States House of Representatives as a Republican. He was first elected in 1874 to the 44th Congress, defeating Democrat Amasa G. Cook by 217 votes. He represented Wisconsin's 2nd congressional district, covering Columbia, Dane, Jefferson, and Sauk counties. Caswell was subsequently elected to the 45th, 46th and 47th Congresses serving from March 4, 1875 to March 3, 1883. In 1885, he founded the Citizens' State Bank of Fort Atkinson. He was once again elected to the 49th and subsequent congresses through to the 51st Congress however this time representing Wisconsin's 1st congressional district from March 4, 1885, to March 3, 1891. As a representative, he was active in establishing the Federal appeals court system and overseeing the construction of the Library of Congress. Caswell was defeated in the Republican primaries in 1890 by state senator Henry Allen Cooper, who was defeated in the general election by Clinton Babbitt.

After his time in Congress, Caswell returned to Fort Atkinson to practice law. He died there on April 26, 1919, and was buried in Evergreen Cemetery.

References

External links
Lucien B. Caswell's Reminiscences An archival collection documenting the life of Lucien B. Caswell, digitized by the University of Wisconsin Digital Collections Center.

 

1827 births
1919 deaths
People from Swanton (town), Vermont
Republican Party members of the Wisconsin State Assembly
People of Wisconsin in the American Civil War
Beloit College alumni
Republican Party members of the United States House of Representatives from Wisconsin
19th-century American politicians
People from Fort Atkinson, Wisconsin